Denmark chose Dorthe Andersen and Martin Loft, with the song "Kun med dig", to be their representatives at the 1996 Eurovision Song Contest, to be held on 18 May in Oslo. "Kun med dig" was chosen as the Danish entry at the Dansk Melodi Grand Prix on 9 March. However, Denmark was one of seven countries which failed to qualify for the Eurovision final from a pre-qualifying round, so they were not represented in Oslo.

Before Eurovision

Dansk Melodi Grand Prix 1996 
The final was held at the DR TV studios in Copenhagen on 9 March 1996 and hosted by Hans Otto Bisgård. Five songs competed in the contest and the winner was selected solely by a public televote. The results of the public televote were revealed by Denmark's regions and "Kun med dig" was an overwhelming winner, receiving more votes than the other four songs combined.

At Eurovision 
In 1996, for the only time in Eurovision history, an audio-only qualifying round (from which hosts Norway were exempt) was held on 20 March as 29 countries wished to participate in the final but the European Broadcasting Union had set a limit of 22 (plus Norway). The countries occupying the bottom seven places after the pre-qualifier would be unable to take part in the main contest. After the voting, "Kun med dig" had received 22 points, placing 25th and bringing Denmark's participation in 1996 to a premature end.

Voting

References 

1996
Countries in the Eurovision Song Contest 1996
Eurovision